Katherine Laverne Starks (July 21, 1922 – November 3, 2016), known professionally as Kay Starr, was an American singer who enjoyed considerable success in the late 1940s and 1950s. She was of Iroquois and Irish heritage. Starr performed multiple genres, such as pop, jazz, and country, but her roots were in jazz.

Life and career
Kay Starr was born Katherine Laverne Starks on a reservation in Dougherty, Oklahoma. Her father, Harry, was an Iroquois native American; her mother, Annie, was of mixed Irish and Native American heritage. When her father got a job installing water sprinkler systems for the Automatic Sprinkler Company, the family moved to Dallas. Her mother raised chickens, whom Starr serenaded in the coop. Her aunt Nora was impressed by her 7-year-old niece's singing and arranged for her to sing on a Dallas radio station, WRR. Starr finished 3rd one week in a talent contest, and placed first every week thereafter. She was given a 15-minute radio show. She sang pop and country songs with a piano accompaniment. By age 10 she was making $3 a night, generous pay during the Great Depression.

When Starr's father changed jobs, the family moved to Memphis, where she continued performing on the radio. She sang Western swing music, still mostly a mix of country and pop. While working for Memphis radio station WMPS, misspellings in her fan mail inspired her and her parents to change her name to "Kay Starr".

At 15, she was chosen to sing with the Joe Venuti orchestra. Venuti had a contract to play in the Peabody Hotel in Memphis which called for his band to feature a girl singer, a performer he did not have at the time. Venuti's road manager heard Starr on the radio and recommended her although she was young and her parents insisted on a midnight curfew.

In 1939, she worked with Bob Crosby and Glenn Miller, who hired her to replace the ill Marion Hutton. With Miller she recorded "Baby Me" and "Love with a Capital You". They were not a great success, in part because the band played in a key that, while appropriate for Hutton, did not suit Kay's vocal range.

After finishing high school, she moved to Los Angeles and signed with Wingy Manone's band. From 1943 to 1945 she sang with Charlie Barnet's ensemble, retiring for a year after contracting pneumonia and later developing nodes on her vocal cords as a result of fatigue and overwork.

In 1946 Starr became a soloist and a year later signed a contract with Capitol Records. The label had a number of female singers signed up, including Peggy Lee, Ella Mae Morse, Jo Stafford, and Margaret Whiting, so it was hard to find her a niche of her own. In 1948 when the American Federation of Musicians was threatening a strike, Capitol wanted to have each of its singers record a back list for future release. Being junior to all these other artists meant that every song Starr wanted to sing was taken by her rivals on the label, leaving her a list of old songs which nobody else wanted to record.

In 1950 she returned home to Dougherty and heard a fiddle recording of "Bonaparte's Retreat" by Pee Wee King. She liked it so much that she wanted to record it. She contacted Roy Acuff's publishing house in Nashville and spoke to Acuff directly. He was happy to let her record it, but it took a while for her to make clear that she was a singer, not a fiddler, and therefore needed to have some lyrics written. Acuff came up with a new lyric, and "Bonaparte's Retreat" became her biggest hit up to that point, with close to a million sales.

In 1955, she signed with RCA Victor Records. However, at this time, rock-and-roll was displacing the existing forms of pop music and Kay had only two hits, the aforementioned, which is sometimes considered her attempt to sing rock and roll, and sometimes as a song poking fun at it, "The Rock and Roll Waltz". She stayed at RCA Victor until 1959, hitting the top ten with "My Heart Reminds Me", then returned to Capitol.

Most of Starr's songs had jazz influences. Like those of Frankie Laine and Johnnie Ray, they were sung in a style that anticipated rock and roll songs. These included her hits "Wheel of Fortune" (her biggest hit, No. 1 for 10 weeks), "Side by Side", "The Man Upstairs", and "Rock and Roll Waltz". One of her biggest hits was her version of "(Everybody's Waitin' For) The Man with the Bag", a Christmas song that became a holiday favorite.

After rock-and-roll swept older performers from the charts, Starr appeared in the television series Club Oasis, mostly associated with the bandleader Spike Jones. She recorded several albums, including Movin'  (1959), Losers, Weepers… (1960), I Cry By Night (1962), and Just Plain Country (1962).

After leaving Capitol for a second time in 1966, Starr continued touring in the US and the UK. She recorded several jazz and country albums on small independent labels, including  How About This, a 1968 album with Count Basie.

In the late 1980s she performed in the revue 3 Girls with Helen O'Connell and Margaret Whiting, and in 1993 she toured the United Kingdom as part of Pat Boone's April Love Tour. Her first live album, Live at Freddy's, was released in 1997. She sang with Tony Bennett on his album Playin' with My Friends: Bennett Sings the Blues (2001).  Two of her songs, Powder Your Face with Sunshine and It's a Good Day, appeared in the 2007 movie Fido.

Starr died on November 3, 2016 in Los Angeles at the age of 94 from complications of Alzheimer's disease.

Discography
 Songs by Kay Starr (Capitol, 1950)
 Capitol Presents Kay Starr (Capitol, 1953)
 The Kay Starr Style (Capitol, 1953)
 The Hits of Kay Starr (Capitol, 1954)
 In a Blue Mood (Capitol, 1955)
 The One, the Only (RCA Victor, 1956)
 Swingin' with the Starr (Liberty, 1956)
 Blue Starr (RCA Victor, 1957)
 Singin' Swingin with Erroll Garner (Crown, 1957)
 Rockin' with Kay (RCA Victor, 1958)
 Movin'! (Capitol, 1959)
 I Hear the Word (RCA Victor, 1959)
 Movin' on Broadway (Capitol, 1960)
 Losers, Weepers (Capitol, 1960)
 Kay Starr: Jazz Singer (Capitol, 1960)
 Starr Bright (RCA Camden, 1960)
 Just Plain Country (Capitol, 1962)
 I Cry by Night (Capitol, 1962)
 Kay Starr and the Gerald Wiggins Trio (Crown, 1962)
 Kay Starr Sings (Tops, 1956)
 Kay Starr Sings (Coronet, 1963)
 Kay Starr Sings Volume 2 (Coronet, 1963)
 The Fabulous Favorites! (Capitol, 1964)
 On Stage (Coronet, 1964)
 Tears & Heartaches/Old Records (Capitol, 1966)
 Portrait of a Starr (Sunset, 1966)
 How About This with Count Basie (Paramount, 1968)
 When the Lights Go On Again (ABC 1968)
 Country (GNP Crescendo, 1974)
 Back to the Roots (GNP Crescendo, 1975)
 Kay Starr (GP, 1981)
 The Uncollected Kay Starr in the 1940s–1947 (Hindsight, 1985)
 The Uncollected 1949 Vol. 2 (Hindsight, 1986)
 Live at Freddy's 1986 (Baldwin Street Music, 1987)
 I've Got To Sing 1944-1948 (Hep, 1998)
 Sweetheart of Song Live (Collectors' Choice Music 2001)

Singles

A peaked at No. 2 on Hot Country Songs charts
B Peaked at No. 5 on Hot Country Songs charts

References

External links

Interview at NAMM Oral History Library (1994)
Kay Starr interview on KUOW 94.9 (NPR) Seattle, 2006

1922 births
2016 deaths
20th-century American women singers
20th-century American singers
21st-century American women singers
21st-century American singers
American jazz singers
American women jazz singers
Big band singers
Capitol Records artists
Deaths from Alzheimer's disease
Deaths from dementia in California
Glenn Miller Orchestra members
Jazz musicians from Oklahoma
Native American singers
People from Murray County, Oklahoma
RCA Victor artists
Singers from Oklahoma
Torch singers
Traditional pop music singers
20th-century Native American women
20th-century Native Americans
21st-century Native American women
21st-century Native Americans